Oenopota hanazakiensis is a species of sea snail, a marine gastropod mollusk in the family Mangeliidae.

Description

Distribution
This species occurs in the Sea of Japan.

References

External links
 

hanazakiensis
Gastropods described in 1958